The Sistuhs is a 1979 musical play by American playwright Saundra Sharp.

Plot
A series of vignettes and monologues about the interweaving lives of a group of African American women.

References

External links
Worldcat

1979 plays
Plays set in the United States
African-American plays
African-American women